Patricia Alma Hitchcock O'Connell (7 July 1928 – 9 August 2021) was an English-American actress and producer, acting under the name Pat Hitchcock. She was the only child of English director Alfred Hitchcock and film editor Alma Reville, and had small roles in several of her father's films, with her most substantial appearance being in Strangers on a Train (1951).

Early life
Hitchcock was born on 7 July 1928 in London, the only child of film director Alfred Hitchcock and film editor Alma Reville. The family moved to Los Angeles, California, in 1939. 

As a child, Hitchcock knew she wanted to be an actress, and made her first onscreen appearance as an uncredited extra alongside her mother in Sabotage (1936). In the early 1940s, she began acting on the stage and doing summer stock. Her father helped her gain a role in the Broadway production of Solitaire (1942). She also played the title role in the Broadway play Violet (1944).

After graduating from Marymount High School in Los Angeles in 1947, she attended the Royal Academy of Dramatic Art in London and also appeared on the London stage.

Career
In early 1949, her parents arrived in London to make Stage Fright, Hitchcock's first British-made feature film since emigrating to Hollywood. Pat did not know she would have a walk-on part in the film until her parents arrived. Because she bore a resemblance to the star, Jane Wyman, her father asked if she would mind also doubling for Wyman in the scenes that required "danger driving". 

She had supporting roles in three of her father's films. In Stage Fright (1950), she played a jolly acting student named Chubby Bannister, one of Wyman's school chums; Strangers on a Train (1951), playing Barbara Morton, sister of Anne Morton (Ruth Roman), the lover of Guy Haines (Farley Granger); and Caroline in Psycho (1960). In this role, she offers to share her tranquilizers with Marion Crane (Janet Leigh), having received them from her mother prior to her wedding night. Hitchcock was an extra in her father's film Sabotage (1936). She and her mother, Alma Reville, are in the crowd waiting for, then watching, the Lord Mayor's Show parade.

Hitchcock also worked for Jean Negulesco on The Mudlark (1950), which starred Irene Dunne and Alec Guinness, playing a palace maid, and again was cast as a maid in the first episode of the 1953 television series Life with Father. She had a bit-part in DeMille's The Ten Commandments (1956).

As well as appearing in ten episodes of her father's half-hour television programme, Alfred Hitchcock Presents, Hitchcock worked on a few others, including Playhouse 90, which was live, directed by John Frankenheimer. Acting for her father, however, remained the high point of her acting career, which she interrupted to bring up her children. (Hitchcock has a small joke with her first appearance on his show – after saying good night and exiting the screen, he sticks his head back into the picture and remarks: "I thought the little leading lady was rather good, didn't you?")

She also served as executive producer of the documentary The Man on Lincoln's Nose (2000), which is about Robert F. Boyle and his contribution to films.

For several years, she was the family representative on the staff of Alfred Hitchcock's Mystery Magazine. She supplied family photos and wrote the foreword of the book Footsteps in the Fog: Alfred Hitchcock's San Francisco (2002) by Jeff Kraft and Aaron Leventhal. A biography of her mother, Alma Hitchcock: The Woman Behind the Man, was co-written with Laurent Bouzereau, and published in 2003.

Personal life and death

Hitchcock married Joseph E. O'Connell, Jr., son of Boston businessman Joseph E. O'Connell, on 17 January 1952, at Our Lady Chapel in St. Patrick's Cathedral, New York. The couple had three daughters, Mary Alma Stone, Teresa "Terry” Carrubba, and Kathleen "Katie" Fiala. O'Connell died in 1994.

Hitchcock died of natural causes in her sleep at her home in Thousand Oaks, California, on 9 August 2021, one month after her 93rd birthday. Her daughter Teresa made the following statement: "She was always really good at protecting the legacy of my grandparents and making sure they were always remembered. ... It’s sort of an end of an era now that they’re all gone."

Filmography

Film

Television

References

External links

 
 Pat Hitchcock at Find a Grave
 
 

Alfred Hitchcock
1928 births
2021 deaths
20th-century English actresses
21st-century English actresses
Actresses from London
Alumni of RADA
Burials at Valley Oaks Memorial Park
English emigrants to the United States
English film actresses
English film producers
English people of Irish descent
English stage actresses
English television actresses
People from Solvang, California